A strand plain or  strandplain  is a broad belt of sand along a shoreline with a surface exhibiting well-defined parallel or semi-parallel sand ridges separated by shallow swales. A strand plain differs from a barrier island in that it lacks either the lagoons or tidal marshes that separate a barrier island from the shoreline to which the strand plain is directly attached. Also, the tidal channels and inlets which cut through barrier islands are absent. Strand plains typically are created by the redistribution by waves and longshore currents of coarse sediment on either side of a river mouth. Thus, they are part of one type of wave-dominated delta.

Examples of strand plains:
Western Louisiana
Eastern Texas
West coast of Namibia
South-east and south-west coasts of Australia, and in the Gulf of Carpentaria
Letea and Caraorman, Danube Delta, Romania
Kustvlakte, Suriname
Cayo Costa, Florida

See also
Beach
Beach evolution
Chenier
Coast
River delta 
Shore

References

Coastal and oceanic landforms